Jasmin Wagner (born 20 April 1980), better known as Blümchen, is a German pop and dance music singer and actress. Although she releases her English albums under the name Blossom, her German stage name  actually translates to "floret" or "small flower".

Early life
Born in Hamburg, West Germany, to a German father and a Croatian mother, she began performing as a cheerleader for the Hamburg Blue Angels, a squad associated with the Hamburg Blue Devils American football team.

Career

1995–1996: Career beginnings and Herzfrequenz
In 1995, when she was just 15, she started her musical career under the name Blümchen. She became the most successful German female singer of the 1990s. She also released singles and albums in other German-speaking countries, Scandinavia and Asia.

The first release was the debut studio album Herzfrequenz in 1996, preceded by the chart hit "Herz an Herz", a Paso Doble cover version. This was followed by the singles "Kleiner Satellit (Piep, Piep)", "Boomerang", "Du und ich", all becoming chart successes. In 1996, Wagner released her first English language single, the only single released as Blümchen and Blossom, the Queen cover version "Bicycle Race". The release of the latter paved the way for Wagner's career for the international releases under the moniker Blossom, with the release of the studio album Heartbeat, Herzfrequenz's counterpart, along with the English versions of "Herz an Herz" and "Du und ich", the singles "Heart to Heart" and "You and me". "Bicycle Race" has also been included on a Queen tribute cover compilation album titled Queen Dance Traxx I, which also featured an ensemble cast song, labeled as Acts United, "We are the Champions".

1997–1998: Verliebt... and Jasmin
In 1997, Wagner released her second studio album Verliebt... alongside its english language counterpart In Love... as Blossom. Singles from Verliebt... have been the Nena cover "Nur geträumt", "Verrückte Jungs" and "Gib mir noch Zeit" ("Just a dream" and "Give me more Time" as Blossom). Later the album Verliebt..., sublabeled as "Die Fanedition", has been re-released with a reworked cover art, a bonus medley and a new song, the single "Sesam-Jam (der, die, das)", which samples the German versions' Sesame Street theme.

In 1998, she released her eponymous third studio album Jasmin, which features the three singles "Blaue Augen", the Ideal cover "Ich bin wieder hier", a Rozalla cover, and "Es ist vorbei". The album marks a soft departure from a happy hardcore sound to a more pop and dance sound. In 1998, she also contributed to the charity single "Let the Music Heal Your Soul" as part of the supergroup Bravo All Stars.

1999–2000: Live in Berlin and Die Welt gehört dir
In 1999, the album Jasmin was re-released with reworked cover art, along with two new songs, the singles "Heut' ist mein Tag" and "Tu es mon île", a French language version of "Du bist die Insel", which previously appeared on the Verliebt... album. The same year, Wagner released her first and only Live album "Live in Berlin", which featured a previously unreleased song, the Christmas single "Unter'm Weihnachtsbaum".

In 2000, Wagner released her fourth studio album Die Welt gehört dir, which features the three singles "Ist deine Liebe echt?", "Die Welt gehört mir" and "Ich vermisse dich", the last mentioned of which served as her farewell single as Blümchen to end up a chapter.

2001–2002: Für immer und ewig and films
Before stopping releasing music as Blümchen, the greatest hits compilation album Für immer und ewig alongside a previously unreleased song, the promotional single "Es ist nie vorbei" featuring Swedish artist E-Type, has been released. Wagner also appeared on the 2001 charity single "Die Stadt mit der Nase im Wind" as part of the supergroup Hamburg Allstars. In 2001, she appeared on a Norwegian rock bands' Turbonegro tribute cover album Alpha Motherfuckers with the song "Are you Ready for some Darkness" featuring Die Ärzte member Bela B. Due to the drastic departure from her previous electronic sound to an independent rock sound, Wagner used the stage name Denim Girl for the first and only time.

The same year, Wagner released her first and only promotional single mononymously as Jasmin, the Christmas song "Santa Claus Is Comin' to Town", an Eddie Cantor cover, which was only available exclusively at Tchibo stores. Wagner has also ventured into acting making cameo appearances in several movies, most notably as a race car fan in the 2001 film Driven, starring Sylvester Stallone.

2003–2007: Singles and Die Versuchung

After a brief hiatus from the music industry, Wagner returned with a new record deal on Polydor in 2003 under her real name Jasmin Wagner with the single "Leb deinen Traum" for her upcoming fifth studio album. The song proved to be a moderate success, peaking #24 at the German Single Chart, and served as the theme song for the talent show Popstars – Das Duell. For her new direction to a more mature pop rock sound, Wagner worked with a string of German well known artists and songwriters such as Inga Humpe, Peter Plate and Uwe Fahrenkrog-Petersen. In 2004, the second single "Helden wie wir" written by Plate followed. In 2004, Wagner performed these two singles, alongside other new tracks such as "Erster Tag", "Sonne in mir", "Schmetterling", "Lieblingslied" or "Hellwach" at Happy Family in Mannheim. Other songs she presented were "Wann wenn nicht jetzt", "Frei" and "Das Meer ruft meinen Namen" in Oldenburg. After album announcement delays and dissatisfied with the direction, Wagner decided to cancel the release of her untitled studio album. Still, the studio recording of "Schmetterling" managed to get leaked. In 2004, Wagner continued appearing on several compilation albums, such as Best of Mania, with the Olivia Newton-John cover "Hopelessly Devoted to You" and on Your Stars for Christmas with "Der kleine Stern", a German language Ciro Dammicco cover of "Soleado". Wagner also sang the title song "The Love of my Life" for the motion picture's soundtrack 7 Zwerge - Männer allein im Wald.

In 2005, still at Polydor, Wagner released her first and so far only studio album Die Versuchung as Jasmin Wagner. The album's musical style features a more chanson, swing and retro 1960s pop sound. It features the single "Männer brauchen Liebe" and the double A-Side single, "Komm schon werd' wütend" and "Morgen, wenn Ich weg bin". The album proved to be commercially unsuccessful, staying in the German Album Charts for just five weeks, which caused it to be dropped by Polydor afterwards. Wagner also appeared in the role of Maxi in the 2007 gangster-comedy film Breathful.

2008–2018: Theatre work and collaborations

Wagner appeared in several theatre productions, also providing vocals on several of their soundtracks. One of them was the song "Bis ans Ende der Welt", which she recorded in 2008 with Dietmar Loeffler, on the album Männerbeschaffungsmaßnahmen. In 2010, Wagner reunited with the supergroup Hamburg Allstars for another charity single, "You'll Never Walk Alone" and recorded the "Check Eins" theme song for broadcaster ARD.

Her song "Boomerang" (1996) was part of an Internet campaign in early 2010 against Deutschland sucht den Superstar, the German spin-off of Pop Idol. In an attempt to prevent the winner Mehrzad Marashi's debut single, "Don't Believe", from reaching number one in the charts, "Boomerang" was purchased online en masse, reaching number 7 in the charts, higher than its 1996 peak of number 11, but still not high enough to unseat "Don't Believe". This made "Boomerang" Wagner's fifth top-ten single, over a decade after its release. The campaign was presumably inspired by a similar campaign in Britain against The X Factor, where "Killing in the Name" by Rage Against the Machine was the Christmas number one in 2009.

In 2011, Wagner recorded the song "Oh, dieser Sound", a Superpunk cover, for her Superpunk tribute compilation album. The participation in the 2011 play "Alexandra – Glück und Verhängnis eines Stars" about the famous German singer Alexandra, where Wagner was playing the lead role, produced a soundtrack tribute album in 2012, exclusively distributed through Reader's Digest. She also appeared as a featured artist on the Wise Guys song "Küss mich" on their 2014 studio album Achterbahn. This feature marks the last time Wagner was credited as Jasmin Wagner before returning as Blümchen in 2019.

2019–present: Blümchen comeback and new record deal 
In 2019, after a hiatus, Wagner returned as Blümchen and released her first new single "Computerliebe", again a Paso Doble cover version. In the same year, Wagner had earlier re-recorded a new version of her debut single "Herz an Herz" with Ray Kuba, which was remixed by the band Marquess. For this release, she recorded the verses of the Paso Doble original version, which were absent in the 1995 version. She also collaborated with David Hasselhoff on the 2019 single "(You Made the) Summer Go Away".

After many years of requests, Wagner made her first comeback performance as Blümchen in March 2019 in front of an audience of 60,000 at the Veltins Arena in Gelsenkirchen, Germany.  Jasmin was overwhelmed by the strong reception she received. In a statement to the BILD newspaper, she revealed her joy after performing. "I had imagined it was going to be good. But it was absolutely amazing. To sing along with 60,000 people - it was unbelievable." The return as Blümchen proved high in demand, as tour dates kept quickly accumulating and Jasmin ending up performing in 22 additional concerts in Germany in 2019. 

In 2020, Wagner signed a new record deal with German label Schubert Music. She recorded her new album Von Herzen, which was released 23 July 2021 under the stage name Jasmin Wagner and was to "introduce her new electro-schlager sound", combined with a "modern, danceable schlager sound", according to a label spokesman. The album reached number 6 in Germany's official Top 100 Album Chart.

The first single from Von Herzen was the song "Gold", released on 20 April 2021. The song was a moderate success, reaching #42 on Germany's official Singles Download Chart and #10 in the Schlager Charts. A duet with rapper FiNCH, "Herzalarm", was announced with release due on 25 June 2021. The track became a top-10 hit for both artists, reaching number 7 in Germany's Official Single Charts. This was the highest chart placing for Wagner in the German Singles Chart since her song "Boomerang" re-entered the chart also at #7 in 2010. The success of "Herzalarm" also gave Wagner a new chart record, making her one of the few German solo female artists (along with Nena) to have top-40 hit songs in four consecutive decades. After 14 of Wagner's singles reached the top 40 in the 1990s, 2 singles ("Ist Deine Liebe Echt?", "Leb Deinen Traum") in the early 2000s, and "Boomerang" at number 7 in 2010, "Herzalarm" became her 18th top-40 placement in the German Singles Chart.

Additional tour dates have also been announced for 2021, including two concerts in Sweden and one in Norway, where Wagner had a number-one hit on the singles chart with her song "Heut' Ist Mein Tag" in 1999.

Artistry

Music
Wagner's Blümchen and Blossom songs varied from around 50 BPM to about 200 BPM and they range from many genres of music, such as Dance, Rave, Happy Hardcore, Pop and Eurodance, mixed with simple melodies and lyrics. Although she also released pop ballads such as "Gib mir noch Zeit", "Es ist vorbei" or "Ich vermisse dich". During Wagner's career, she experimented with different other genres and styles, such as 2-step ("Automatisch", "U-Bahn"), house ("Immer noch verliebt"), disco ("Ist deine Liebe echt"), reggae fusion ("(You made the) Summer go Away") or indie rock ("Are you Ready for some Darkness"). While Wagner's albums Herzfrequenz and Verliebt... features the same number of happy hardcore songs with only refrains, she changed the direction for the third and fourth albums Jasmin and Die Welt gehört dir, to a softer dance pop sound with refrain and verses. Wagner is known for numerous songs and singles being covers of other artists such as Paso Doble, Queen, Nena, Sesame Street, Ideal, Rozalla, Eddie Cantor, Ciro Dammicco, Turbonegro, Olivia Newton-John or Superpunk. She is also noted for singing multilingual, mostly German or English, but also in French, such as the French version of "Du bist die Insel", titled "Tu es mon île", a duet with the French singer Yta Farrow.

Public image
Because of her drastic music direction change aside her Blümchen sound, Wagner adopted other stage names, such as Blossom for the international Blümchen releases, Denim Girl for the indie rock song "Are you Ready for some Darkness" or her real names Jasmin Wagner or simply Jasmin for her recent works, like the 60s sound of Die Versuchung.

Personal life
For four years, Wagner was in a relationship with Lucas Cordalis. In 2015, she married Swiss entrepreneur Frank Sippel. She divorced Sippel, in 2020.

Discography

 Herzfrequenz/Heartbeat (1996)
 Verliebt.../In Love... (1997)
 Jasmin (1998)
 Die Welt gehört dir (2000)
 Die Versuchung (2006)
 Von Herzen (2021)

Filmography

Films
 2001: Driven – as Ingrid
 2003: Operation Dance Sensation – as Schwester Stefanie
 2007: Breathful – as Maxi
 2007: Eis für Anfänger – as Anna
2020: Kartoffelsalat 3 - Das Musical - as Frau Schmidt

Series
 1998: Sesamstraße – episode "1852", as Blümchen
 2009: Hallo Robbie! – episode "Schwarze Schafe", as Heike
 2011: SOKO München – episode "Unter die Haut", as Fabia Winter
 2011: Notruf Hafenkante – episode "Männer sind Schweine", as Anna Güttel
 2017: Nord Nord Mord – episode "Clüver und der König von Sylt", as Radio reporter
 2018: Polizeiruf 110 – episode "Crash", as Blümchen

Voice-over
 2006: Tony Tough 2: A Rake's Progress – as Cornelia Cook

Awards 

1996
 RSH Gold "Best Singer"
 Bravo Gold Otto
 Popcorn Award "Best Singer"
 Pop/Rocky Award

1997
 ECHO Award "Best National Artist"
 RSH Gold
 Bravo Gold Otto (multiple categories)
 Popcorn Award (beating artist Mariah Carey)
 Pop/Rocky Schlumf Award (narrowly beating artist Toni Braxton)
 Goldene Stimmgabel in category "Disco/Dance Music"
 VIVA Awards (Nominee)

1998
 ZDF Golden Tuning Fork
 Bravo Gold Otto (multiple categories)
 Pop/Rocky Schlumf Gold Award
 RSH Gold Award

1999
 ZDF Golden Tuning Fork Nominee
 VIVA Awards Nominee
 ENERGY Award (Sweden)
 Bravo Silver Otto "Best Singer"
 Echo Award

2000 
 Bravo Bronze Otto
 Popcorn Bronze Award

2003
 Maxim (Germany) Woman of the Year

References

External links 

  
 
 
 Jasmin Wagner TV appearances photo archive 

1980 births
Living people
English-language singers from Germany
German people of Croatian descent
German cheerleaders
German dance musicians
Musicians from Hamburg
Happy hardcore musicians
21st-century German dancers
21st-century German women singers